Vera Sergeevna Roik (1911-2010) was a Ukrainian embroiderer.

The Museum of Ukrainian Embroidery which opened in 2012 was named after her, and was closed in 2015.

In 2006 she was honoured as a Hero of Ukraine, for "the development of Ukrainian culture, the establishment of the traditions of national decorative and applied art, many years of selfless creative and pedagogical activity".

References

External links
Great personalities: Vera Roik school project slideshow

1911 births
2010 deaths
Ukrainian embroiderers
20th-century women textile artists
Recipients of the title of Hero of Ukraine